Ajit Bandyopadhyay may refer to:

Ajit Bandyopadhyay (actor), Bengali actor
Ajit Bandyopadhyay, a character in Byomkesh Bakshi series